Financial Institutions Division is a Bangladesh government division under the Ministry of Finance responsible for managing all state owned banks, financial institutions, and stock exchanges. Md. Sheikh Mohammad Salim Ullah is the head of the division.

History
Financial Institutions Division on 8 June 2010 by taking over some of the responsibilities of the Finance Division.

References

2010 establishments in Bangladesh
Organisations based in Dhaka
Government agencies of Bangladesh
Government departments of Bangladesh